Darren Michael Soto (born February 25, 1978) is an American attorney and Democratic politician from Kissimmee, Florida, who is the U.S. representative for Florida's 9th district.

Before his election to Congress, Soto served four years in the Florida Senate and five in the Florida House of Representatives, representing parts of central Florida.

Early life and education
Soto was born in Ringwood, New Jersey, to a Puerto Rican father, O. Lou Soto, and an Italian-American mother, Jean Soto. As a student at Lakeland Regional High School, Soto aspired to attend Yale University, but told The Record that his opportunities to attend were hampered by his teachers' unwillingness to write recommendations for him while they were involved in a contract dispute with the district.

Florida House of Representatives
In 2006, Soto ran for the Florida House of Representatives from the 40th district, unsuccessfully challenging incumbent Andy Gardiner. In April 2007, he won the crowded Democratic primary in a special election to replace John Quinones, who had resigned to run for the Osceola County Commission. In the general election, Soto defeated Republican nominee Tony Suarez by 285 votes. Soto was overwhelmingly reelected in 2008 and 2010.

During his three terms in the Florida House, Soto supported laws to curb illegal street racing, passed the “John C Curry” Firefighter Death Benefit Act to protect families of fallen firefighters who died in training exercises, and the Bus Driver Notification Act to help school bus safety.

Florida Senate
In 2012, Florida Senate districts were redrawn, and Soto opted not to run for reelection in the House but instead to run for the newly created 14th district, which included predominantly Latino areas of Orange, Osceola, and Polk Counties. He won his party's nomination uncontested and defeated Republican nominee Will McBride with over 70% of the vote.

In 2013, Soto voted for legislation to expedite driver's license access for DREAMers but it was ultimately vetoed by Governor Rick Scott, setting off statewide protests. He unsuccessfully proposed an amendment to require jury votes of 10 jurors rather than a majority of 7 for death penalties.

In 2014, Soto passed legislation answering the Florida Supreme Court's call to give it the authority to admit immigrant lawyers to the Florida Bar. He also advocated legislation to give DREAMers in-state college tuition. He secured the initial state funding to establish a Poinciana Valencia Campus and to initiate the Lake Toho Restoration, which will clean water flowing through the Northern Everglades. In addition, he led the Democratic House and Senate Caucuses in drafting a Congressional map during the 2014 Special Session on Redistricting.

During the 2015 legislative session, Soto was fundamental in securing $11.9 million in funding for Valencia College's Poinciana campus. He also successfully pushed for $20 million to restore the Kissimmee River. This earned him the Audubon Society of Florida's "Champion of the Everglades" award. Soto also proposed legislation to ban fracking in Florida. He secured $10 million in Florida's budget to promote economic growth in Osceola County for a new facility to manufacture high-tech sensors, but Governor Scott vetoed the project. Soto also introduced a bill to boost minimum teacher pay to $50,000 per year.

Soto steered funding to his district, including $15 million for the UCF Sensors Manufacturing Center, $12 million to complete the construction of the Poinciana Valencia College campus, $4 million in supplemental school construction money, $750,000 for the Northern Everglades and Lake Toho initiatives, and $150,000 for a transition house that offers temporary housing for veterans. In 2016, Soto supported Chloe's Law to construct barriers around water bodies adjacent to state roads, the Deaf Floridian's ID bill, and the Juvenile Clean Slate bill, which automatically seals misdemeanor records for juveniles who reach 21 years of age and do not reoffend as adults.

U.S. House of Representatives

Elections

2016 

Soto won the Democratic nomination to succeed Representative Alan Grayson, who stepped down to run in the primary for U.S. Senate in Florida's 9th congressional district. Soto earned 36% of the vote in a four-way primary election. The district is Democratic-leaning and contains all of Osceola County and parts of Orange and Polk counties. Soto represented the majority of this district while serving in the Florida House of Representatives and the Florida Senate. The Orlando Sentinel endorsed him in his primary race, calling him an "effective lawmaker". In the general election, Soto defeated Republican nominee Wayne Liebnitzky, 57%–43%.

2018 

On August 28, Soto won the Democratic primary with 66% of the vote, defeating a challenge from Grayson. Soto received endorsements from multiple Democratic organizations, such as the National Organization for Women, Pride Fund to End Gun Violence, Giffords PAC, Democratic Environmental Caucus of Florida, National Committee to Preserve Social Security & Medicare, Equality PAC, League of Conservation Voters, Human Rights Campaign, Florida AFL-CIO, Florida Young Democrats, Orlando Professional Fire Fighters International Association of Fire Fighters Local 1365, Central Florida Police Benevolent Association, Florida LGBTA Democratic Caucus, eMgage PAC, Congressional Progressive Caucus PAC, and Planned Parenthood. Soto also had the backing of Vice President Joe Biden, U.S. Representatives John Lewis and Linda Sánchez, Florida State Senator Vic Torres, and every Florida Democratic member of Congress.

On November 6, Soto won the general election, defeating Republican nominee Wayne Liebnitzky with 58% of the vote.

2020 

Soto ran for a third term and was virtually unopposed in the Democratic primary, with only one challenger, who dropped out in October 2019. In the November 3 general election, he defeated Republican nominee Bill Olson with just over 56% of the vote.

Tenure
Soto is the first congressman of Puerto Rican descent elected from Florida. In his first few weeks, Speaker Nancy Pelosi named him one of three freshmen members to the Democratic Steering and Policy Committee. He was also named co-chair of the House Democratic Caucus New Economy Task Force.

On April 5, 2017, Soto and Senator Bill Nelson passed their Hurricane Hunters bill (HR 1008) by amendment to the Weather Research and Forecasting Innovation Act of 2017. This legislation adds two backup Hurricane Hunter aircraft to the NOAA fleet to increase hurricane monitoring and preparedness.

On December 23, 2017, Soto passed his second bill, the Foreign Spill Protection Act, with co-introducer Carlos Curbelo. The bill eliminates a $1 billion cap on damages for foreign oil drillers, whose oil spills pollute America’s waters, to better protect Florida’s coasts.

Soto introduced a bill to rename a Kissimmee Post Office (HR 4042) at 1415 West Oak St after the Borinqueneers. This bill passed both chambers of Congress and was signed into law on March 23, 2018. The Borinqueneers were a U.S. Army segregated unit of Puerto Ricans who fought in World War I, World War II and the Korean War.

Soto passed a law to protect billfish, such as marlin, spearfish, and sailfish. H.R. 4528 closes a loophole in the Billfish Conservation Act making it illegal to sell billfish in the continental United States. The law passed the House on June 25, 2018, and was signed into law on August 2, 2018.

Soto negotiated with Brightline (now Virgin Trains) to build the link between their train and SunRail. He was tied for first for most laws passed by a freshman member of the 115th Congress. He also filed the second most bills of any freshman.

Following reelection, Soto secured a spot on the Energy and Commerce Committee.

On June 24, 2019, Soto passed his first law of the 116th Congress, the Strengthening Mosquito Abatement for Safety and Health (SMASH) Act, which aims to combat future Zika outbreaks in Florida, Puerto Rico and other areas.

On July 25, 2019, Soto passed the Venezuela TPS Act of 2019 out of the House as the last bill to pass before the August District Work Period.

On December 18, 2019, Soto voted for both articles of impeachment against President Donald Trump.

In his second term, Soto worked with Val Demings and Stephanie Murphy to renew federal grants to the Central Florida region, including over $30 million for affordable housing and to prevent homelessness, $3.25 million to fund local anti-terrorism efforts, and $1.961 million for zero-emission Lynx Lymmo buses.

Soto also assisted in securing federal grants of nearly $30 million for Hurricane Irma disaster relief to Polk and Osceola Counties, over $3 million for healthcare clinics in Osceola and Polk Counties, and $250,000 to improve Kissimmee and Winter Haven airports.

During the COVID-19 pandemic, Soto voted for all four pandemic relief packages, including the Coronavirus Preparedness and Response Supplemental Appropriations Act 2020, Families First Coronavirus Response Act, Coronavirus Aid Relief and Economic Security Act (CARES Act) and the Paycheck Protection Program and Health Care Enhancement Act to help the nation combat the crisis. He has helped lead Florida’s delegation in securing additional supplies of remdesivir from his position on the Energy and Commerce Committee. On May 15, 2020, Soto voted for the HEROES Act, which passed the House and provided further pandemic relief. This legislation included his Save Our Homes Act, which helps homeowners save their homes from foreclosure by ending forbearance agreement balloon payments. On October 2, 2020, Soto voted for the updated HEROES Act. This compromise legislation amended the original bill, would provide further pandemic relief and passed the House. At the time of its passage, the Senate still had failed to pass a new pandemic relief package.

On June 26, 2020, Soto passed legislation out of the House designating the Pulse National Memorial in recognition and memory of the 49 killed and 53 injured at the Pulse Nightclub shooting. He introduced this bill with Demings and Murphy. Upon its passage, Soto said, "Today, we remind the world that hate will never defeat love, grief can turn into strength and that a place of loss can become a sanctuary of healing. Together, we will continue to open minds and hearts. We will make the Pulse Memorial a national symbol of hope, love and light."

On July 1, 2020, Soto voted for the Moving Forward Act, a national infrastructure improvement plan. Of the bill, he said, "As our nation continues to confront the coronavirus crisis, this legislation will create millions of good-paying jobs and equip our nation with the 21st-century infrastructure critical to growing our economy and helping our communities prosper for decades to come. Passage of this bold legislation also means more funding to help complete the I-4 Expansion quickly and safely."

Committee assignments
 United States House Committee on Energy and Commerce
 United States House Energy Subcommittee on Communications and Technology
 United States House Energy Subcommittee on Consumer Protection and Commerce
 United States House Energy Subcommittee on Environment and Climate Change
 Committee on Natural Resources
 Subcommittee on Indigenous Peoples of the United States

Caucus memberships
 Congressional Progressive Caucus
 New Democrat Coalition
 Congressional Hispanic Caucus
U.S.-Japan Caucus
Problem Solvers Caucus

Political positions

Immigration
Soto is a staunch advocate for DREAMers and has worked with fellow members of the Hispanic Caucus to pass the DREAM Act. In June 2018, he traveled with several Democratic members of Congress to Homestead, Florida, to tour a detention facility, where he argued against Trump's zero tolerance policy and the separation of children and families. He has been a vocal advocate in Congress for Alejandra Juarez, the wife of an Iraq combat veteran and mother of two American daughters, who was deported to Mexico due to Trump's policy. "Zero tolerance literally ripped this family apart", Soto said. "The administration is so extreme on immigration that they're deporting the spouses of military veterans."

Environmental policy
For 2017, Soto was considered the Florida Congressional delegation's greenest member. He received a perfect score of 100 for his environmental issues voting record from the National League of Conservation Voters. He introduced the Wild and Scenic River Study Act of 2017 (H.R.3961), which passed unanimously out of committee on January 17, 2018. On April 16, 2018, it passed unanimously out of the House. Soto helped lead opposition to Trump administration proposals to permit oil drilling off Florida's Gulf and Atlantic coasts during House Committee on Natural Resources meetings. He has also supported funding increases for the National Estuary Program the National Wildlife Refuge System program.

On June 6, 2018, Soto passed his Shark and Billfish Protection Act out of House Natural Resources Committee. Bill Nelson passed the Senate companion bill on October 2, 2017.

Gun control
Soto received an F rating from the NRA during his first term in Congress and supported numerous gun law reforms. On February 27, 2019, he voted for the Universal Background Check Bill. Soto received an A rating from the NRA in 2012, but his views changed after the 2012 Sandy Hook shooting. In the Florida Senate, he became a reliable vote for gun control, which ultimately led to earning a D rating from the NRA for his service there from 2013 to 2016.

After the 2016 Orlando nightclub shooting, Soto called for a special session to prevent those on the FBI's No Fly List from purchasing firearms. Since 2017, he has been a reliable vote for gun law reform. After the 2018 Stoneman Douglas High School shooting, he proposed a "Gun Safety Action Plan". He listed five steps: universal background checks for gun purchases, keeping guns away from those who are a danger to themselves or others, banning assault weapons and bump stocks, creating a "red-flag" system to issue gun restraining orders, and disallowing anyone on the federal terrorism no-fly list from buying a gun. Soto also said gun control would be "one of those litmus test issues" in the 2018 midterm elections.

Hurricane safety
Working with Nelson, Soto passed his first law in Congress on April 18, 2017, creating a backup fleet of hurricane hunter aircraft to monitor hurricanes affecting Florida and other nearby areas.

Recovery assistance
Soto is working on debt reduction and tax, healthcare, agriculture and small business relief to assist Puerto Rico's economic recovery. He also co-signed a bipartisan letter requesting FEMA Designation of Individual Assistance for the citizens of Orange, Osceola, Polk, Lake and Seminole Counties after Hurricane Irma. In 2018, he voted to renew recovery funds to Central Florida and Puerto Rico after Hurricanes Irma and Maria.

Personal life

Soto’s major hobby is music and he has been writing songs and playing in bands since he was in high school. He is a singer, songwriter and guitarist for the Orlando folk rock band Orange Creek Riders. They have played various live shows, such as Orlando Fringe Festival, Planned Parenthood’s Rock and Roe Concert, Delandapalooza, along with various political events. As part of its "Best Of" series, Orlando Weekly named Orange Creek Riders the “Best Congressional Folk Band”. He also hosts a radio show and podcast, "Rock and Politics", which combines current political issues with related music.

On April 1, 2018, Soto's wife, Amanda Soto, was arrested at Walt Disney World and charged with disorderly intoxication. In a statement, Darren Soto said his wife had been in treatment for depression for years and had recently stopped taking medication in accordance with her treatment plan and under her doctor's supervision. He added that "she deeply regrets her actions and takes full responsibility for them."

See also
 List of Hispanic and Latino Americans in the United States Congress

References

External links

 Congressman Darren Soto official U.S. House website
 Campaign website
 

 
 Florida House of Representatives profile

1978 births
21st-century American politicians
American people of Italian descent
Puerto Rican people in Florida politics
Democratic Party members of the United States House of Representatives from Florida
Florida lawyers
George Washington University Law School alumni
Hispanic and Latino American members of the United States Congress
Lakeland Regional High School alumni
Living people
Democratic Party members of the Florida House of Representatives
People from Ringwood, New Jersey
Rutgers University alumni
Hispanic and Latino American state legislators in Florida